USS Worcester was a Contoocook-class bark-rigged screw steam sloop-of-war in the United States Navy.

Built as Manitou of unseasoned white oak timbers, she was laid down in 1863 at Boston, Massachusetts, by the Boston Navy Yard and launched on 25 August 1866. Renamed Worcester on 15 May 1869, she was apparently placed in commission on 27 February 1871, Commander William D. Whiting in command. Among the ship's officers at the time of her commissioning was the naval strategist and author, Lieutenant Commander Alfred T. Mahan.

Service history

Voyage to England, 1871
After an abbreviated fitting out, Worcester loaded a cargo of supplies to be delivered to the suffering victims of the Franco-Prussian War. Although she had never conducted sea trials, she departed Boston on 5 March 1871 with a heavy cargo in her holds. Heavy weather sprang up soon after she left port, and Commander Whiting was obliged to use caution in using the ship's spread of canvas until he felt sure of the ship's sea-keeping qualities. Three days out, on 8 March, the port forward boiler burst, sending clouds of steam into the forward part of the ship and severely scalding 10 men – four of whom later died. A subsequent court finding revealed that the explosion had been due to defective tubes.

For most of the remainder of the voyage, the ship weathered heavy gales that lasted from two to three days at a stretch. But for the explosion, the ship performed well on her maiden voyage and carried a good spread of canvas for the remainder of the trip to England. Making port at Plymouth, England, on 4 April, Worcester eventually discharged her cargo at London. The plan to sell the cargo to raise money to purchase relief supplies for the French fell through. It seemed that the French really did not need help after all, and those who did could not afford to pay the cost of transporting the supplies from the French coast to their districts.

Worcester concluded her business at London, sailed to Liverpool where she received on board some ordnance before returning to Boston. There, she remained until January 1872.

North Atlantic Squadron, 1872–1875
Made flagship of the North Atlantic Squadron under Rear Admiral Samuel Phillips Lee, Worcester served in that capacity until 1875.

In ordinary, 1876–1881
She was placed in ordinary in 1876 and laid up at the Norfolk Navy Yard, Portsmouth, Virginia, the following year. Made receiving ship at Norfolk in 1878, with Capt. Walter W. Queen in command, Worcester was laid up at the Norfolk Navy Yard during 1879 and 1880. Eventually, the ship's hull rotted, and it was found unfit for repair in 1881. On 27 September 1883, the sloop-of-war was sold and was presumably broken up soon thereafter.

References

Sloops of the United States Navy
1866 ships
Maritime incidents in March 1871